The masked laughingthrush (Pterorhinus perspicillatus) is a species of laughingthrush found in China and Vietnam. It is often seen in small noisy flocks of seven. Its Chinese name [七姊妹 qī zǐ-mèi] means 'seven sisters'.

This species was formerly placed in the genus Garrulax but following the publication of a comprehensive molecular phylogenetic study in 2018, it was moved to the resurrected genus Pterorhinus.

References

External links
 Masked laughingthrush videos on the Internet Bird Collection

masked laughingthrush
Birds of China
Birds of Vietnam
masked laughingthrush
masked laughingthrush
Taxobox binomials not recognized by IUCN